Autochthonus is a genus of moths belonging to the family Tineidae. The genus was described in 1891 by Lord Walsingham.

Species
Autochthonus chalybiellus  Walsingham, 1891 (from Gambia/Tanzania)
Autochthonus singulus Huang , Hirowatari & Wang, 2009 (from China)

References

Huang, G.H.; T. Hirowatari & M. Wang, 2009: Siloscinae Gozmány (Lepidoptera: Tineoidea) from China with description of a new species. Transactions of the American Entomological Society 135 (3): 389–394. DOI: 10.3157/061.135.0306.
Walsingham, Thomas de Grey 1891a. African Micro-Lepidoptera. - Transactions of the Entomological Society of London 1891(1):63–132, pls. 3–7

Siloscinae
Taxa named by Thomas de Grey, 6th Baron Walsingham
Moth genera